Thalictrum minus, known as lesser meadow-rue, is a perennial herb in the family Ranunculaceae that is native to Europe, Northwest Africa, Yemen, Ethiopia, South Africa, Southwest Asia, and Siberia. It grows on sand dunes, shingle, coastal rocks or calcareous grassland, cliffs and rocky gullies at up to  elevation at southern latitudes.

The plant contains an alkaloid 'Thalidisine', which is also present in other Thalictrum species.

References

minus
Plants described in 1753
Taxa named by Carl Linnaeus